The 1990 Maine Black Bears football team was an American football team that represented the University of Maine as a member of the Yankee Conference during the 1990 NCAA Division I-AA football season. The team compiled a 3–8 record (2–6 against conference opponents) and tied for seventh place in the Yankee Conference. Rob Noble and Tom Rogers were the team captains. 

Kirk Ferentz led the team in his first season as a head coach. Ferentz was hired in January 1990 after nine years as Iowa's offensive line coach.

Schedule

References

Maine
Maine Black Bears football seasons
Maine Black Bears football